Simon Pirkl (born 3 April 1997) is an Austrian footballer who plays as a left back for Blau-Weiß Linz.

External links
 
 Simon Pirkl at ÖFB

1997 births
Living people
Austrian footballers
Austria youth international footballers
Austria under-21 international footballers
FC Wacker Innsbruck (2002) players
SC Austria Lustenau players
SV Horn players
FC Blau-Weiß Linz players
2. Liga (Austria) players
Austrian Regionalliga players
Association football defenders
Sportspeople from Innsbruck
Footballers from Tyrol (state)